Antler Lake is a hamlet in Alberta, Canada within Strathcona County.

Antler Lake consists of residences developed on the eastern and southern shores of the lake, with some also developed on Hazelnut Island. It also has two playgrounds and access to outdoor recreation opportunities in the surrounding area.

The hamlet is near the Strathcona Wilderness Centre, Cooking Lake - Blackfoot Grazing, Wildlife and Provincial Recreation Area, and the Elk Island National Park of Canada. Antler Lake is also situated within  of the Uncas Elementary School, which many of the local children attend.

Demographics 
The population of Antler Lake according to the 2022 municipal census conducted by Strathcona County is 428, a decrease from its 2018 municipal census population count of 435.

See also 
List of communities in Alberta
List of designated places in Alberta
List of hamlets in Alberta

References 

Hamlets in Alberta
Strathcona County
Designated places in Alberta